= HD 131473 =

Binary star system in the constellation of Boötes

Observation data Epoch J2000 Equinox J2000
- Constellation: Boötes
- Right ascension: 14^{h} 53^{m} 23.34844^{s}
- Declination: +15° 42′ 18.602″
- Apparent magnitude (V): 6.403 (6.89 / 7.55)‍

Characteristics
- Spectral type: F4IV / G1IV
- U−B color index: +0.122
- B−V color index: +0.570

Astrometry
Radial velocity (R_{v})	20.8 km/s
Proper motion (μ)	RA: −22.72 mas/yr Dec.: +21.58 mas/yr
Parallax (π)	20.99±0.93 mas
Distance	155 ± 7 ly (48 ± 2 pc)
Absolute magnitude (M_{V})	2.98

Orbit
Period (P)	313 yr
Semi-major axis (a)	1.358″
Eccentricity (e)	0.50
Inclination (i)	108.5°
Longitude of the node (Ω)	12.5°
Periastron epoch (T)	1824.0
Argument of periastron (ω) (secondary)	49°

Details

HD 131473 A
Mass	1.34 M_{☉}

HD 131473 B
Mass	1.19 M_{☉}

Other designations
- BD+16°2705, HD 131473, HIP 72846, HR 5550, SAO 101273

Database references
SIMBAD	data
- A
- B

HD 131473 is a binary star system in the northern constellation of Boötes. The primary is an F-type subgiant with a stellar classification of F4IV, while its companion is a G-type subgiant with a stellar classification of G1IV, and both are somewhat more massive than the Sun. They perform a rather eccentric orbit once every 313 years.

An M7.5 star 50″ from HD 131473 is a common proper motion companion. Any orbit around the inner pair would take tens of thousands of years.
